Dali or Dalí may refer to:

Chinese history
 Kingdom of Dali (937–1253 AD), centered in modern Yunnan
 Kingdom of Nanzhao or Dali, Kingdom of Dali's predecessor state
 Dali, Emperor Daizong of Tang's third and last regnal period (766–779)
 Dali or Đại Lịch, a state established by Nong Zhigao in 1042 on the Chinese-Vietnamese border

Places

Afghanistan
 Dali, Afghanistan, a village in Balkh Province

China
 Dali Bai Autonomous Prefecture, Yunnan
 Dali City, a county-level city in Dali Prefecture, Yunnan
 Dali Town, Yunnan
 Xiaguan, Dali City, also known as Dali New Town
 Dali County, Shaanxi
 Dali, Fujian, a town in Shunchang County, Fujian
 Dali, Guangdong, a town in Foshan, Guangdong
 Dali, Beiliu, a town in Guangxi
 Dali, Teng County, a town in Guangxi
 Dali Subdistrict, Tangshan, Hebei

Cyprus
 Dali, Cyprus, a village in Cyprus

Iran
 Dali, Fars, a village in Fars Province, Iran
 Dali, Izeh, a village in Khuzestan Province, Iran
 Dali, West Azerbaijan, a village in West Azerbaijan Province, Iran

Niger
 Dali, Tanout, former town in Zinder Region, Niger

Republic of China (Taiwan)
 Dali District, Taichung
 Dali River, a river in Taichung

Fictional
 Dali, a location in Final Fantasy IX

Music
 Dali (Dalida album) (1984)
 Dali (Ali Project album) (1994)
 Danish Audiophile Loudspeaker Industries

Other uses
 Dali (goddess), a goddess of hunting in Georgian mythology
 2919 Dali, a main-belt asteroid
 Espace Dalí, Salvador Dalí's permanent exhibition in France
 Dali (crater), a crater on Mercury

People with the surname
 Athanase Dali (born 1967), Ivorian rugby union player
 Bikash Lal Dali (born 1980), Nepalese cricketer
 Gala Dalí (1894–1982), model, Salvador Dalí's wife
 Gizela Dali (1937–2010), Greek actress
 Kenza Dali (born 1991), French footballer 
 Salvador Dalí (1904–1989), Spanish surrealist artist
 Sudiat Dali (born 1962), Singaporean footballer
 Wissem Dali (born 1995), Algerian volleyball player

People with the given name
 Dali Fatnassi, Tunisian shotputter, Athletics at the 2012 Summer Paralympics – Men's shot put
 Dali Jazi (1942–2007), Tunisian politician, jurist, and political scientist
 Wang Dali (born 1968), Chinese Olympic swimmer
 Dali Yang (born 1964), American political science professor
 Zhang Dali (born 1963), Chinese artist in Beijing
 Dali Benssalah (born 1992), French-Algerian actor
 Dalí (footballer), Equatoguinean footballer

See also
 Ad Dali', capital town of Ad Dali' Governorate, Yemen
 Dalai Lama, religious leader
 DALI (disambiguation)
 Dalli (disambiguation)
 Salvador Dalí (disambiguation)